1998–99 Bosnia and Herzegovina Football Cup was the fifth season of the Bosnia and Herzegovina's annual football cup. The Cup was won by Bosna Visoko who defeated Sarajevo in the final.

Overview 
Unlike the previous season in this edition there was no agreement between Football Federation of Bosnia and Herzegovina and the Football Federation of Herzeg-Bosnia so that each one organized its own competition.

This was the only one to be recognized by UEFA.

Quarterfinals

|}

Semifinals

|}

Final

See also
 1998–99 First League of Bosnia and Herzegovina

External links
Statistics on RSSSF

Bosnia and Herzegovina Football Cup seasons
Cup
Bosnia